The 1979–80 Texas A&M Aggies men's basketball team represented Texas A&M University as a member of the Southwest Conference during the 1979–80 college basketball season. The team was led by head coach Shelby Metcalf and played their home games at G. Rollie White Coliseum in College Station, Texas.  After finishing atop the conference regular season standings, the Aggies won the SWC tournament to receive the conference's automatic bid to the NCAA tournament. As No. 6 seed in the Midwest region, Texas A&M beat No. 11 seed Bradley in the opening round and upset No. 3 seed North Carolina in the second round before falling to No. 2 seed and eventual National champion Louisville in the Sweet Sixteen. The Aggies finished with a record of 26–8 (14–2 SWC).

Roster 

Source:

Schedule and results

|-
!colspan=9 style=| Regular season

|-
!colspan=9 style=| SWC Tournament

|-
!colspan=9 style=| NCAA Tournament

Sources:

References

Texas A&M Aggies men's basketball seasons
Texas AandM
Texas A and M Aggies men's b
Texas A and M Aggies men's b
Texas AandM